Blackberrys is an Indian clothing brand owned by Mohan Clothing Co. Pvt Ltd. It was established in 1991 and mainly caters to men.

Operations
As of August 2011, the Blackberrys brand has 21 franchise stores, 94 company-owned showrooms and is present in over 900 multi-brand outlets.

References

Further reading
 "New tidings: Blackberrys chalks out aggressive expansion plans" (August 21, 2011) from Business India

External links
 Official website

Clothing companies established in 1991
Clothing brands of India
Indian companies established in 1991